Henrik Björklund (born September 22, 1990) is a Swedish professional ice hockey forward. He is currently playing for Färjestad BK in the Swedish Hockey League (SHL).

Playing career
During the 2006–07 season, on March 2, 2007 against the Malmö Redhawks, Björklund, then 16, became the youngest player to ever play with Färjestad BK. The rest of the season he played with the club's U18 team and was the team top scorer with 25 points in 14 games. He also won the scoring title for the U18 Allsvenskan league.

Björklund was initially heralded as "the new Håkan Loob" before he was drafted 111th overall by the Calgary Flames in the 2009 NHL Entry Draft.

Career statistics

Regular season and playoffs

International

References

External links
 

1990 births
BIK Karlskoga players
Bofors IK players
Calgary Flames draft picks
Färjestad BK players
Living people
Modo Hockey players
Örebro HK players
Rögle BK players
Swedish ice hockey forwards
IF Troja/Ljungby players
Sportspeople from Karlstad